This is a list of all deputy premiers of the Soviet Union.

List

Deputy chairman of the Council of People's Commissars
 Lev Kamenev (July 6, 1923 - January 16, 1926)
 Alexei Rykov (July 6, 1923 - February 2, 1924)
 Alexander Tsiurupa (July 6, 1923 - May 8, 1928)
 Vlas Chubar (July 6, 1923 - May 21, 1925, April 24, 1934 - July 4, 1938)
 Mamia Orakhelashvili (July 6, 1923 - May 21, 1925)
 Valerian Kuybyshev (January 16, 1926 - November 5, 1926, 10 November 1930 - May 14, 1934)
 Jānis Rudzutaks (January 16, 1926 - May 25, 1937)
 Grigoriy Ordzhonikidze (November 5, 1926 - November 10, 1930)
 Vasily Schmidt (August 11, 1928 - December 1, 1930)
 Andrey Andreyevich Andreyev (December 22, 1930 - October 9, 1931)
 Valery Ivanovich Mezhlauk (April 25, 1934 - February 25, 1937, October 17, 1937 - December 1, 1937)
 Nikolay Antipov (April 27, 1935 - June 21, 1937)
 Anastas Mikoyan (July 22, 1937 - March 15, 1946)
 Stanislav Kosior (January 19, 1938 - May 3, 1938)
 Lazar Kaganovich (August 21, 1938 - May 15, 1944, December 20, 1944 - March 15, 1946)
 Nikolai Voznesensky (April 4, 1939 - Mar. 10, 1941)
 Nikolai Bulganin (September 16, 1938 - May 15, 1944)
 Andrey Vyshinsky (May 31, 1939 - May 15, 1944)
 Rosalia Zemlyachka (8 May 1939 - August 26, 1943)
 Alexei Kosygin (April 17, 1940 - March 15, 1946)
 Mikhail Pervukhin (17 April 1940 - May 15, 1944)
 Vyacheslav A. Malyshev (April 17, 1940 - May 15, 1944)
 Kliment Voroshilov (May 7, 1940 - 15 March 1946)
 Lavrentiy Beria (3 February 1941 - March 15, 1946)
 Lev Mekhlis (6 September 1940 - May 15, 1944)
 Maksim Saburov (March 10, 1941 - May 15, 1944)
 Vyacheslav Molotov (May 6, 1941 - August 16, 1942)
 Georgy Malenkov (May 15, 1944 - March 15, 1946)

Deputy chairman of the Council of Ministers  
 Lavrentiy Beria (March 19, 1946 - March 5, 1953)
 Andrey Andreyev (March 19, 1946 - March 15, 1953 )
 Alexei Kosygin (March 19, 1946 - March 15, 1953, December 7, 1953 - December 25, 1956, July 5, 1957 - May 4, 1960)
 Anastas Mikoyan (19 March 1946 - March 15, 1953, April 27, 1954 - February 28, 1955)
 Nikolai Voznesensky (March 19, 1946 - March 7, 1949)
 Kliment Voroshilov (March 19, 1946 - March 15, 1953)
 Lazar Kaganovich (March 19, 1946 - March 6, 1947, December 18, 1947 - March 5, 1953)
 Georgy Malenkov (August 2, 1946 - March 5, 1953, February 9, 1955 - June 29, 1957)
 Maksim Saburov (February 8, 1947 - March 5, 1953, 7 December 1953 - February 28, 1955)
 Nikolai Bulganin (March 5, 1947 - April 7, 1950)
 Vyacheslav Alexandrovich Malyshev (December 19, 1947 - March 15, 1953, December 7, 1953 - December 25, 1956)
 Alexey Krutikov (July 13, 1948 - February 8, 1949)
 Aleksandr Yefremov (March 8, 1949 - November 23, 1951)
 Ivan Tevosian (June 13, 1949 - March 15, 1953, December 7, 1953 - December 28, 1956)
 Mikhail Georgievich Pervukhin (January 17, 1950 - March 15, 1953, 7 December 1953 - February 28, 1955)
 Panteleimon Ponomarenko (December 12, 1952 - March 15, 1953)
 Vladimir Kucherenko (February 28, 1955 - December 25, 1956)
 Pavel Lobanov (February 28, 1955 - April 9, 1956)
 Mikhail Khrunichev (February 28, 1955 - December 25, 1956 April 8, 1961 - June 2, 1961)
 Abraham P. Zavenyagin (February 28, 1955 - December 31, 1956)
 Vladimir Matskevich (April 9, 1956 - December 25, 1956)
 Dmitriy Ustinov (December 14, 1957 - March 13, 1963 )
 Alexander F. Zasyadko (March 31, 1958 - November 9, 1962)
 Joseph I. Kuzmin (March 31, 1958 - March 20, 1959)
 Nikolai Ignatov (May 4, 1960 - December 26, 1962)
 Vladimir Novikov (May 4, 1960 - November 24, 1962, March 26, 1965 - December 19, 1980)
 Konstantin Rudnev (June 10, 1961 - October 2, 1965)
 Benjamin Emmanuilovich (July 17, 1962 - December 20, 1980)
 Peter Fadeevich Lomako (November 10, 1962 - October 2, 1965)
 Dmitry Stepanovich Polyansky (November 23, 1962 - October 2, 1965)
 Alexander Shelepin (November 23, 1962 - December 9, 1965)
 Mikhail Avksentevich Lesechko (November 24, 1962 - October 24, 1980)
 Ignat Trofimovich Novikov (November 24, 1962 - July 20, 1983)
 Leonid Smirnov (March 13, 1963 - November 15, 1985)
 Nikolai Baibakov (October 2, 1965 - October 14, 1985)
 Nikolai Tikhonov (October 2, 1965 - September 2, 1976)
 Vladimir Kirillin (Oct. 2, 1965 - January 22, 1980)
 Mikhail Yefremov (November 13, 1965 - October 29, 1971)
 Petro Shelest (May 19, 1972 - May 7, 1973)
 Zia Nurievich Nureyev (3 April 1973 - November 1, 1985)
 Ivan Arkhipov (March 21, 1974 - October 27, 1980)
 Nikolai Martynov (June 25, 1976 - November 15, 1985)
 Konstantin Fedorovich Katushev (March 16, 1977 - July 29, 1982)
 Tikhon Kiselyov (December 5, 1978 - 23 October 1980)
 Gury Marchuk (January 28, 1980 - October 28, 1986)
 Valentin Makeyev (October 23, 1980 - January 20, 1983)
 Nikolai Talyzin (October 24, 1980 - October 14, 1985, October 1, 1988 - June 7, 1989)
 Leonid Arkad'evich Kostandi (November 4, 1980 - September 5, 1984)
 Alexey Antonov (December 19, 1980 - October 1, 1988)
 Ivan Bodiul (December 19, 1980 - May 30, 1985)
Boris Antonovich Shcherbina (January 13, 1984 - June 7, 1989)
 Yakov Ryabov (September 27, 1984 - June 19, 1986)
 Ivan Silayev (1 November 1985 - October 9, 1990)
 Lev Voronin (November 15, 1985 - June 7, 1989)
 Yuri Maslyukov (November 15, 1985 - February 5, 1988)
 Yuri Petrovich Batalin (December 20, 1985 - June 7, 1989)
 Gennady G. Vedernikov (June 19, 1986 - June 7, 1989)
 Vladimir Gusev (June 19, 1986 - December 26, 1990)
 Vladimir Mikhailovich Kamentsev (September 1, 1986 - June 7, 1989)
 Boris L. Tolstoy (February 6, 1987 - June 7, 1989)
 Igor Belousov (February 12, 1988 - December 26, 1990)
 Aleksandra Pavlovna Biryukova (October 1, 1988 - September 17, 1990)
 Leonid Abalkin (July 17, 1989 - December 26, 1990)
 Vitaly Husseynovich Doguzhiev (July 17, 1989 - December 26, 1990)
 Nikolai Pavlovich Laverov (July 17, 1989 - December 26, 1990)
 Pavel Mostovoy ( July 17, 1989 - December 26, 1990)
 Lev Ryabev (July 17, 1989 - December 26, 1990)
 Stepan Aramaisovich Sitaryan (October 24, 1989 - December 26, 1990)
Deputy Prime Minister of the USSR
 Nikolai Laverov (January 15, 1991 - November 26, 1991)
 Yuri Maslyukov (January 15, 1991 - November 26, 1991)
 Lev Ryabev (March 1, 1991 - November 26, 1991)
 Fedor Senko (March 1, 1991 - November 26, 1991)
 Vladimir Shcherbakov (March 1, 1991 - May 16, 1991)
 Bihojal Rakhimova (May 16, 1991 - November 26, 1991)
Deputy of the Committee on the operational management of the economy of the USSR
 Arkady Ivanovich Volsky (24 August 1991 -  25 December 1991)
 Yury Luzhkov (24 August - 29 October 1991)
 Grigory Yavlinsky (24 August - 25 December 1991)
Deputy of the Interstate Economic Committee of the Economic Community
 Gennady Kulik (November 18, 1991 - December 26, 1991)
 Amangeldy Imanakyshevich Bektemisov (November 29, 1991 - December 26, 1991)

See also
 Premier of the Soviet Union
 First Deputy Premier of the Soviet Union
 List of leaders of the Soviet Union

Deputy
Lists of office-holders in the Soviet Union
Deputy
Soviet Union